"Lawn Chair Lazy" is a song recorded by Canadian country group James Barker Band. The song was co-written by the band's frontman James Barker, with Gavin Slate. It was the debut single from the band, and the lead single from their extended play Game On.

Commercial performance
"Lawn Chair Lazy" reached a peak of #6 on Billboard Canada Country chart. This made it the highest-charting debut single by a Canadian country artist at the time. It was certified Gold by Music Canada.

Music video
The official music video for "Lawn Chair Lazy" premiered on Taste of Country on June 20, 2019.

Charts

Certifications

References

2016 songs
2016 debut singles
James Barker Band songs
Songs written by James Barker (singer)
Songs written by Gavin Slate
Song recordings produced by Todd Clark
Universal Music Canada singles